Juan Carlos Moreno (born February 28, 1975 in Maiquetía, Vargas State, Venezuela), is a former relief pitcher in Major League Baseball who played for the Texas Rangers (2001) and San Diego Padres (2002). He batted and threw left-handed.

His career lasted for two seasons.  He had a 3–3 record, with 39 strikeouts and a 4.37 ERA, in 47 innings pitched.

See also
 List of players from Venezuela in Major League Baseball

External links
, or Retrosheet, or Pura Pelota (Venezuelan Winter League)

1975 births
Living people
Águilas del Zulia players
Arizona League Athletics players
Charlotte Rangers players
Gulf Coast Red Sox players
Major League Baseball pitchers
Major League Baseball players from Venezuela
Navegantes del Magallanes players
Oklahoma RedHawks players
Pawtucket Red Sox players
People from Vargas (state)
San Diego Padres players
Texas Rangers players
Tiburones de La Guaira players
Tulsa Drillers players
Venezuelan expatriate baseball players in the United States
West Michigan Whitecaps players